Shirish Saravanan, known also as Metro Shirish for his work in his debut film Metro, is an actor from Tamil film industry.

Early life
Born in Chennai, India, Shirish completed his schooling at the Gill Adarsh Higher Secondary School. He then enrolled on to the Visual Communications course in the Loyola College. Having a keen interest in acting from childhood, he trained at the Kalairani Acting School, took up dance classes with choreographer Jayanthi and got trained in fights and action with Pandiyan master.

Film career 
It was in college, that he met Ananda Krishnan, who after conducting an audition decided to cast him as the lead in his next movie. His performance in Ananda Krishnan's Metro garnered him rave reviews with many critics appreciating his notable performance in the movie along with Filmfare's award for Best Male Debut-South.  In 2018, he acted in Raja Ranguski with  director Dharanidharan is alongside Chandini Tamilarasan. His next film, which started filming in August 2017, is a village based entertainer titled Pistha, which is directed by the editor of Metro, Ramesh Bharathi. Mrudula Murali and Arundhati Nair are the lady leads. Notably, this film will be music director Dharan's 25th project.

Awards

Filmography

References

External links 
 Twitter profile
 Facebook profile

Living people
Tamil male actors
21st-century Indian male actors
Male actors in Tamil cinema
People from Erode district
Loyola College, Chennai alumni
1994 births